Ahmedabad–Patna Weekly Express is a Superfast Express train of the Indian Railways connecting  in Gujarat and   in Bihar. It is currently being operated with 19421/19422 train numbers on once in week.

Service

It averages 49 km/hr as 19421 Ahmedabad–Patna Weekly Express and covers 1669 km in 35 hrs 5 mins & 46 km/hr as 19422 Patna–Ahmedabad Weekly Express and covers 1669 km in 36 hrs 15 mins.

Route and halts 

The important halts of the train are:

Direction reversal

The train reverses its direction 2 times:

See also 

 Ahmedabad–Varanasi Weekly Express
 Kamakhya–Gandhidham Express
 Dwarka Express
 Sabarmati Express

References 
19421/Ahmedabad - Patna (Weekly) Express India Rail Info
19422/Patna - Ahmedabad (Weekly) Express India Rail Info

Rail transport in Gujarat
Rail transport in Madhya Pradesh
Rail transport in Uttar Pradesh
Rail transport in Bihar
Transport in Ahmedabad
Transport in Patna
Express trains in India